The Barbaro Stakes is an  American Thoroughbred horse race once run annually in mid July at Delaware Park Racetrack in Stanton, Delaware. It is now run in October.  

Previously known as the Leonard Richards Stakes, in 2007 it was renamed in honor of Barbaro, the horse who won the Kentucky Derby in 2006 but who eventually died after shattering his leg in that year's Preakness Stakes.

A Grade III race through 2009 but now ungraded, it is open to three-year-old horses running one and one sixteenth mile on the dirt and offers a purse of $100,000.  In 2011, the race was run at 1 mile and 70 yards.
 
There was no race from 1983 through 1996.

Records
Speed  record: (since 1997 at current distance of  miles)
 1:42.41 - Burning Roma (2001)
 Previously the race has been contested at  miles. On June 18, 1960, Victoria Park won the race in a track record time of 1:47.40 for  miles. As at 2020, that record remains intact.

Winners since 1997

Earlier winners (partial list)

1948 - Page Boots
1949 - Sun Bahram
1950 - Post Card
1951 - Hall of Fame
1952 - Jampol
1953 - Jamie K
1954 - Full Flight
1955 - Saratoga
1956 - Ricci Tavi
1957 - Lucky Dip
1958 - Cavan
1959 - Waltz
1960 - Victoria Park
1961 - Hitting away
1962 - Noble Jay
1963 - Crewman
1964 - Sheldrake
1965 - First Family
1966 - Buckpasser
1967 - Damascus
1968 - Balustrade
1969 - North Flight
1970 - The Pruner
1971 - Gleaming
1972 - Floor Show
1973 - London Company
1974 - Silver Florin
1975 - My Friend Gus
1976 - Cinteelo
1977 - True Colors
1978 - Mac Diarmida
1979 - Lucys Axe
1980 - Proctor
1981 - Sportin Life
1982 - Northrop

References
 The Barbaro Stakes at Pedigree Query

Graded stakes races in the United States
Horse races in Delaware
Flat horse races for three-year-olds
Delaware Park Racetrack
Recurring sporting events established in 1948
1948 establishments in Delaware